The Frøya official football team is the official football team for the Norwegian municipality of Frøya in Trøndelag county. They are not affiliated with FIFA or UEFA. Frøya is a member of the International Island Games Association and has taken part in Football at the Island Games.

Frøya Idrettsråd 

The Frøya Idrettsråd is the sports council of Frøya.

Selected Internationals

Record of matches

References

External links 
Official site of the Association Frøya Idrettsråd
Frøya on BBC
Frøya on www.fedefutbol.net
Frøya on www.rsssf.com

Official football team
European national and official selection-teams not affiliated to FIFA
Football teams in Norway